The Alert-Hatcher Building, in Hillsboro, New Mexico, was built in 1884.  It was listed on the National Register of Historic Places in 1995.

It is a "long, basically L-shaped, one-story, New Mexico Vernacular building extending along the south side of Main Street and up the east side of Second Avenue".

References

Hotels in New Mexico
National Register of Historic Places in Sierra County, New Mexico
Buildings and structures completed in 1884